Asmidal is an Algerian industrial group leader in its field, which manages a portfolio of companies' development, production, and marketing "of fertilizers and pesticides.

History and profile
Asmidal was established in 1984. In 2006, it produced about 2 million tonnes of fertilizer products.

See also

List of companies of Algeria

References

External links
Official website

1984 establishments in Algeria
Chemical companies established in 1984
Annaba
Manufacturing companies of Algeria
Petrochemical companies